Francesco Battaglini (13 March 1823 – 8 July 1892) was a Roman Catholic Cardinal and Archbishop of Bologna. 
 
He was born in the Archdiocese of Bologna and received the sacrament of confirmation on 7 October 1827. He was educated at the University of Bologna where he earned his doctorate in theology in 1848. He was ordained to the priesthood on 20 September 1845. After his doctorate he was a professor of philosophy and theology at the Seminary of Bologna, until 1878.

Episcopate
Pope Leo XIII appointed him Bishop of Rimini in February 1879. He remained in the see of Rimini until he was appointed to the metropolitan see of Bologna on 3 July 1882. Like most Archbishops of Bologna he was created Cardinal-Priest of San Bernardo alle Terme in the consistory of 27 July 1885.

Death and burial

He died in 1892 and was buried, temporarily, in the chapel of the Carthusian monastery of Bologna. His body was transferred to the Bentivoglio Chapel, in October 1893. He was again transferred to a new tomb in the parish church of Mirabello, February 2000; the tomb was blessed by Cardinal Giacomo Biffi, Archbishop of Bologna, in 2000.

References

19th-century Italian cardinals
Bishops of Rimini
1823 births
1892 deaths
19th-century Italian Roman Catholic archbishops
Roman Catholic archbishops of Bologna
Cardinals created by Pope Leo XIII